BMW cars have been officially sold in the United States since 1956 and manufactured in the United States since 1994. The first BMW dealership in the United States opened in 1975. In 2016, BMW was the twelfth highest selling brand in the United States. The North American headquarters for BMW is located at 300 Chestnut Ridge Road, Woodcliff Lake, Bergen County, New Jersey. 

The BMW manufacturing plant in Greer, South Carolina, has the highest production volume of the BMW plants worldwide, currently producing approximately 1,500 vehicles per day. The models produced at the Spartanburg plant are the X3, X4, X5,  X6, X7, and XM SUV models.

In addition to the South Carolina manufacturing facility, BMW's North American companies include sales, marketing, design, and financial services operations in the United States, Mexico, Canada, and Latin America. The North American headquarters for its large financial services subsidiary is located in Dublin, Ohio and is responsible for the captive lending for BMW automotive, BMW Motorsport, and Rolls-Royce cars, when buyers lease the vehicles or decide to finance directly with the company.

Spartanburg manufacturing plant 

The BMW Manufacturing Company, also known as BMW Spartanburg, is the BMW Group's only assembly facility in the United States, and is located in Greer, South Carolina. The plant is currently BMW's major global production site for the X3, X4, X5, X6, X7, and XM crossover SUVs, whose biggest market is the U.S., while other BMW models sold in the U.S. market are imported.

History 
BMW announced in 1992 that it would build a  manufacturing facility in Spartanburg County, South Carolina, United States to strengthen its international production system. The plant opened in 1994.

In 2010 BMW announced that it would spend $750 million to expand operations at the Greer plant. This expansion will allow production of 240,000 vehicles a year and will make the plant the largest car factory in the United States by number of employees. BMW's largest single market is the United States, where 339 dealerships sold 346,023 cars in 2015.

The two millionth vehicle built at BMWUSM rolled off the plant in January 2012. It is a vermilion red metallic X3 xDrive35i with Oyster Nevada interior and an M Sport Package, was driven by BMW Associate Terry Gardner, a 16-year BMW veteran, with accompanying associates Renita Williams, Trang Pham and Olga Yurchenko. These associates represent teams from each of the plant's manufacturing technologies: Body, Paint and Assembly. The vehicle was retained on display at the Spartanburg Plant to commemorate the milestone.

The $2.2 billion plant, which employs 23,000 (BMW and contract), is part of the company’s global five-plant production network.

The automaker announced in 2014 an additional $1 billion investment in the facility that will make Spartanburg, South Carolina, BMW's largest US factory, with an annual capacity of 480,000 units when including the X7. There were 411,171 vehicles produced in 2016, of which 70% were exported to 140 countries. The plant is the largest BMW plant in the world in terms of vehicle production volume.

Another record was set in 2018, around 70% of production was exported to 125 markets. The biggest export market was China, accounting for one-third of all export. That same year, BMW ceased exporting the X3 to China.

A nearby dry inland port,  from the port of Charleston, handles many of the plant's needs for cargo and finished vehicles. In 2015 BMW Spartanburg sent 250,000 new cars by rail from to the Charleston port. Some air freight is also used.

Current products 
X3
X4
X5
X6
X7

Previous products 
 BMW 3 Series (E36) (1994–1996; also produced in Germany and South Africa)
 318i Sedan (1994–1995)
 318is Coupe (1994–1995)
 328i Sedan (1996)
 BMW Z3 (E36/4) (1995–2002)
 Roadster 
 M Roadster 
 Coupe 
 M Coupe
 BMW Z4 (E85) (2003–2008; successive generation produced in Germany)
 Roadster 
 M Roadster 
 Coupe 
 M Coupe

Model range in the U.S.

Models offered 
There are several models which have been solely sold in the United States:
 1971-1977 BMW New Six Bavaria: This US-only model offered the more powerful engine in a car with fewer luxury features.
 2005-2016 BMW M5 manual transmission options: The United States and Canada were the only markets where the E60 and F10 M5 was available with a manual transmission.

Engines offered 
Several BMW engines have not been officially sold in the United States, due to emissions regulations. These include:
 M20: Early versions of the M20 engine, which used Jetronic fuel-injection, were not sold in the US.
 M52: Due to high-sulfur fuel in the US at the time, most M52 engines sold in the US used an iron block, instead of the aluminium block used in other markets.
 N53: Due to high-sulfur fuel, the US was one of several countries where the N53 was not sold. Instead, its N52 predecessor remained in use in these countries.
 S50/S52: For the E36 M3, the United States models used different engines to the models used in most other markets. The S50B30US and S52 engines used in the US are less powerful than the equivalent Euro-specification S50 engines.

References

External links
 Factory website
 BMW USA
 BMW Group

Industrial buildings completed in 1994
BMW
Greer, South Carolina
Motor vehicle assembly plants in South Carolina
Companies based in Spartanburg, South Carolina
1994 establishments in South Carolina